Anal Arasu (born as C. M. A. Arasakumar) is an Indian fight master/action choreographer, who works in the Tamil, Telugu, Malayalam and Hindi film industries. He started his career as an extra fighter and assistant to stunt masters including, Kanal Kannan, Stun Siva, Peter Hein and Jaguar Thangam. His work has received critical acclaim.

Influenced by his father, C. M. Arasu, who had done several movies in the 1980s, Arasu stated that he always wanted to be an "action man". Chatrapathy was his first film. He has since gone to collaborate with director Prabhu Deva for the action films Vedi (2011) and Rowdy Rathore (2012). He worked with A. R. Murugadoss for Kaththi (2014) and S. Shankar for I (2015).

Filmography

Fight Master

 2004 Arul
 2004 Chatrapathy
 2005 Jithan
 2005 Ben Johnson (Malayalam)
 2005 Lokanathan IAS (Malayalam)
 2005 Raam
 2006 Azhagai Irukkirai Bayamai Irukkirathu
 2006 Yuga
 2006 Thuruppugulan (Malayalam)
 2006 Jambhavan
 2006 Nenjirukkum Varai
 2006 Thagapansamy
 2006 Baba Kalyani (Malayalam)
 2007 Chotta Mumbai (Malayalam)
 2007 Big B (Malayalam)
 2008 Pidichirukku
 2008 Aandavan (2008 film) (Malayalam)
 2008 Singakutty
 2008 Thenavattu
 2008 Thiruvannamalai
 2009 Puthiya Mukham (Malayalam)
 2009 Sagar Alias Jacky Reloaded (Malayalam)
 2009 Chattambinadu (Malayalam)
 2009 1977
 2009 Madurai Sambavam
 2010 Singam
 2010 Vandae Maatharam
 2010 Anwar (Malayalam)
 2010 The Thriller (Malayalam)
 2010 Chekavar (Malayalam)
 2010 Naan Mahaan Alla
 2011 Christian Brothers (Malayalam)
 2011 Rowthiram
 2011 Yamla Pagla Deewana (Hindi)
 2011 Urumi (Malayalam)
 2011 Azhagarsamiyin Kuthirai
 2011 Bodinayakkanur Ganesan
 2011 Velayudham
 2011 Vedi
 2011 Rajapattai
 2012 The King & the Commissioner (Malayalam)
 2012 Maasi
 2012 Saguni
 2012 Thadaiyara Thaakka
 2012 Rowdy Rathore (Hindi)
 2012 Dabangg 2 (Hindi)
 2013 Mirchi (Telugu)
 2013 Singam II
 2013 Pattathu Yaanai
 2013 Boss (Hindi film)
 2013 Aadhalal Kadhal Seiveer
 2013 Pandiya Naadu
 2014 Heropanti (Hindi)
 2014 Jai Ho (Hindi)
 2014 Holiday: A Soldier Is Never Off Duty (Hindi)
 2014 Kick (Hindi)
 2014 Jeeva
 2014 Kaththi
 2014 Villali Veeran (Malayalam)
 2014 Meaghamann
 2015 I
 2015 Pulan Visaranai 2
 2015 Jil
 2015 Paayum Puli
 2015 Srimanthudu (Telugu)
 2015 Bruce Lee - The Fighter (Telugu)
 2016 Kathakali
 2016 Marudhu
 2016 Darvinte Parinamam (Malayalam)
 2016 Sultan (Hindi)
 2016 Janatha Garage (Telugu)
 2016 Remo
 2016 Premam (Telugu)
 2016 Final Cut of Director (Hindi)
 2016 Maaveeran Kittu
 2017 Bairavaa
 2017 Sivalinga
 2017 Velaiilla Pattadhari 2
 2017 Jai Lava Kusa (telugu)
 2017 Mersal
 2017 Comrade in America (Malayalam)
 2017 Velaikkaran
 2018 Race 3 (Hindi)
 2018 Seema Raja
 2018 Sandakozhi 2
 2019 NGK
 2019 Bigil
 2019 Sanga Thamizhan
 2019 Dabangg 3 (Hindi)
 2020 Shylock (Malayalam)
 2020 Coolie No. 1 (Hindi)
 2021 Chakra
 2022 Veerame Vaagai Soodum
 2022 Aaraattu
 2022 Yaanai
 2022 The Legend
 2022 Viruman
 2022 Godfather
 2023 Indian 2
 2023 "Kisi Ka Bhai Kisi Ki Jaan"

Actor
 2008 Singakutty as Muthu Pandi
 2011 Rajapattai in a special appearance as himself
 2016 Darvinte Parinamam

Awards

Won
 2007 Tamil Nadu State Film Award for Best Stunt Coordinator - Karuppusamy Kuththagaithaarar
 2010 Tamil Nadu State Film Award for Best Stunt Coordinator - Vandae Maatharam
 2010 Ananda Vikatan Award for Best Stunt Choreography - Naan Mahaan Alla
 2010 Vijay Award for Best Stunt Director - Naan Mahaan Alla
 2011 Ananda Vikatan Award for Best Stunt Choreography - Rowthiram
 2012 Vijay Award for Best Stunt Director - Thadaiyara Thaakka
 2012 Ananda Vikatan Award for Best Stunt Choreography - Thadaiyara Thaakka
 2013 South Indian International Movie Awards for Best Fight Choreographer - Pandiya Naadu
 2013 Vijay Award for Best Stunt Director - Pandiya Nadu
 2013 Behindwoods Gold Medal for Best Stunt Choreographer - Singam II and Pandiya Naadu
 2014 South Indian International Movie Awards for Best Fight Choreographer - Kaththi
 2018  V4 MGR Sivaji Academy Award for Best Stunt Master - Mersal
Nominated
 2010 Vijay Award for Best Stunt Director - Singam
 2011 Vijay Award for Best Stunt Director - Rowthiram
 2012 South Indian International Movie Awards for Best Fight Choreographer - Thadaiyara Thaakka
 2014 Vijay Award for Best Stunt Director - Kaththi
 2015 Southern India Cinematographer's Association Awards for Best Stunt Choreographer - Pandiya Naadu
 2019 Norway Tamil Film Festival Award for Best Stunt Choreographer - Bigil

References

External links
 

Living people
Indian action choreographers
1970 births